Norco High School is California Distinguished School comprehensive public high school serving over 2,000 students from grades 9-12 in Norco, California, United States. It is part of the Corona-Norco Unified School District. The current principal is Melissa Bako.

Demographics
As of the 2020–21 school year, the enrollment by race/ethnicity is:
 52% Hispanic
 39% White
 4.2% Asian
 2.4% Black
 1.9% Two or more races
 0.3% Native Hawaiian / Pacific Islander
 0.2% American Indian / Alaska native

Clubs and activities

Norco High School has multiple clubs and student organizations, including an Mock Trial, AFJROTC, Alpha Omega Bible Club, American Cancer Society, Art Club, ASB, Cougar Buddies, Cougar Chronicle, Dance, the Blue Diamond Brigade marching band, Friday Night Live, FBLA(Future Business Leaders of America), History Club, Humanitarian Club, Link Crew, Key Club, Unity, Yearbook, and FFA (Future Farmers of America).

The April 19, 2007 performance of Invincible Summer at the American Repertory Theater in Cambridge, Massachusetts, was disrupted when 87 audience members from Norco High School left the production mid-performance, with one school chaperone approaching the stage and pouring water over the performer's outline notes.

Notable alumni

References

External links
 

Public high schools in California
High schools in Riverside County, California